Vutrisiran, sold under the brand name Amvuttra, is a medication used for the treatment of the polyneuropathy of hereditary transthyretin-mediated (hATTR) amyloidosis in adults. It is a small interfering RNA (siRNA) that interferes with the expression of the transthyretin (TTR) gene.

Vutrisiran was approved for medical use in the United States in June 2022, and in the European Union in September 2022.

History 
The U.S. Food and Drug Administration (FDA) granted the application for vutrisiran orphan drug designation.

Society and culture

Legal status 
On 21 July 2022, the Committee for Medicinal Products for Human Use (CHMP) of the European Medicines Agency (EMA) adopted a positive opinion, recommending the granting of a marketing authorization for the medicinal product Amvuttra, intended for treatment of hereditary transthyretin-mediated (hATTR) amyloidosis. Amvuttra was designated as an orphan medicinal product on 25 May 2018. The applicant for this medicinal product is Alnylam Netherlands B.V. Vutrisiran was approved for medical use in the European Union in September 2022.

Names 
Vutrisiran is the international nonproprietary name (INN).

References

External links 
 

Orphan drugs
RNA interference